Thomas Dereham, Derham or Durham may refer to:

Sir Thomas Dereham, 1st Baronet (c. 1600–1668), of the Dereham Baronets
Sir Thomas Dereham, 4th Baronet (c. 1678–1739)
Thomas Derham  (died 1444/1445), MP for Bishop's Lynn
Thomas Durham School, Philadelphia

See also
Dereham (surname)